There are predominantly two main mountain regions in Ukraine which are Carpathians and Crimean mountains. Ukraine is located at East European Plain, therefore most of its area consists mostly of rolling hills rather than real mountains. Some high peaks could be found in areas of Podilian Tovtry and Donets Ridge and rarely elsewhere.

Chornohora (Black mountain) is mountain range in Carpathians which consists of the most highest mountain peaks in the country. Other notable ranges are Maramureş and Gorgany that are also located in Carpathians. In Crimean mountains the highest mountain range Babuhan Yayla is located closer to the Crimean Southern Coast (also known as UBK) and it is part of the main mountain chain.

This page shows the highest mountains in Ukraine.

Highest mountains in Ukraine 
This list contains peaks with height above 1,500 m. The numbering (except of first 10) is disputable.

External links 
[A link was removed because it sent the user to an unrelated website ]
 Highest peaks of Crimean
 Українські Карпати, “ТОПОГРАФІЯ”, Стрийсько-Санська верховина, Тростян

Ukraine
!Ukraine

Mountains
Ukraine